Taldykorgan Airport is classified as a national aerodrome in the latest AIP. It is capable of accepting Ilyushin Il-76, Tupolev Tu-134, Tupolev Tu-154, Antonov An-8, Antonov An-12, Antonov An-24, Ilyushin Il-14, Ilyushin Il-18, Yakovlev Yak-40, Yakovlev Yak-42, and Antonov An-2 aircraft. It can also accept light aircraft and helicopters of all types.

The Airport houses the 604th Air Base of the Armed Forces of the Republic of Kazakhstan, one of four fast jet facilities in the country operating mainly MiG-27s and Su-27s (previously the 129th Fighter-Bomber Regiment).

Airlines and destinations

References

Airports built in the Soviet Union
Airports in Kazakhstan
Military installations of Kazakhstan
Kazakh Air Defense Forces